Since 1971, the Miami International Auto Show has been held every year in Miami Beach, Florida. The date varies, however, usually it's between the last week in October and the first week in December. This show is one of the most popular auto shows in the United States currently. Formerly known as the South Florida Auto Show and renamed as Miami International Auto Show in 2012, this 10-day event has an average of 650,000 visitors annually, making it one of the highest-attended auto shows in the United States. Along with Los Angeles, Chicago, Detroit and New York, the Miami show is the first-scheduled of the "A-sized category" automobile shows in the United States.

In 2017, the Miami International Auto Show was cancelled due to Hurricane Irma.

Debuts
Over the years, the following vehicles have debuted at the auto show:

1990 Saturn
1994 Honda Passport
1999 Ford Explorer Sport
1999 Ford Explorer Sport Trac
1999 Ford Excursion
2000 Daewoo Nubira
2000 Saab 9-3 Viggen
2000 Saab 9-5
2000 Toyota MR2
2001 Saturn Vue
2002 Hyundai Tiburon
2002 Pontiac Vibe
2004 Land Rover Freelander SE3
2004 Lincoln Mark LT
2004 Lexus GX470
2004 Maserati Coupé
2004 Mercedes-Benz SLK
2004 Subaru B9 Tribeca
2004 Volvo S60 R
2004 Volvo XC90
2005 Cadillac Escalade
2005 Ford Explorer
2005 Subaru Legacy 2.5GT spec.B
2006 Chevrolet HHR Panel Van
2006 Hyundai Azera
2006 Mercury Mariner
2007 Mercedes-Benz CL-Class
2007 Cadillac Escalade Hybrid
2009 Saab 9-5
2009 Jaguar XJ
2009 Volvo C30
2009 Volvo C70

Debuts are either worldwide or North American.

References

External links 
 www.miamiautoshows.com — Official site

Auto shows in the United States
Transportation in Florida